Märkische Schweiz Nature Park is a nature park and reserve in the district of Märkisch-Oderland, in Brandenburg, Germany. It covers an area of 204 km2 (79 sq mi). It was established on October 1, 1990, and is located east of Berlin.

The park's main river is the Stobber. With a surface area of 1.37 km2 the Schermützelsee is its largest lake.

Nature parks in Brandenburg
Protected areas established in 1990
Märkisch-Oderland